Coppathorne is a hamlet in the parish of Poundstock (where the 2011 census was included), Cornwall, England.

References

Hamlets in Cornwall